26 Canis Majoris is a variable star in the southern constellation of Canis Major, located around 1,010 light years away from the Sun. It has the variable star designation MM Canis Majoris; 26 Canis Majoris is the Flamsteed designation. This object is visible to the naked eye as a dim, blue-white hued star with a baseline apparent visual magnitude of 5.89. It is moving further from the Earth with a heliocentric radial velocity of +22 km/s.

With a stellar classification of B2 IV/V, it appears as a B-type main-sequence star intermixed with traits of an evolving subgiant star. Samus et al. (2017) classify it as a slowly pulsating B-type variable star (SPB), which ranges from magnitude 5.84 down to 5.87 with a rotationally-modulated period of 2.72945 days. Briquet et al. (2007) describe it as a chemically peculiar He-variable star, having inhomogeneous distributions of chemical elements across its surface. It has a variable, quasi-dipolar magnetic field, resulting in variations of the magnetic field and line strengths as it rotates.

This star is around 3.6 million years old with a rotation period of 2.7 days. It has 5.5 times the mass of the Sun and 3.25 times the Sun's radius. The star is radiating 1,000 times as much luminosity as the Sun from its photosphere at an effective temperature of 16,157 K.

References

B-type main-sequence stars
B-type subgiants
Slowly pulsating B stars
Chemically peculiar stars
Canis Major
Durchmusterung objects
Canis Majoris, 26
055522
034798
2718
Canis Majoris, MM